Perisesarma bidens, the red claw crab (or red-clawed crab), is a species of crab found in the Indo-Pacific region from Zanzibar to Japan and Fiji.

Size 
Can have a leg span up to 4" (10 cm). Carapace length is usually no more than 2" (5 cm).

Water parameters 
Red claw crabs can survive in freshwater, however in order to thrive these crabs require brackish water (1-2 tbsp. of Marine Salt added per gallon of freshwater). The salt should already be disintegrated and mixed into the water in a bucket before it is added to the tank. These are tropical crabs, and prefer the water temperature between 75-80 °F (23.9-26.7 °C). The pH should be stable around 7.5-8.5.

Habitat 
The recommended tank size for housing is a minimum of 10 gallons. A 10-gallon aquarium can keep 1 male with up to 2 females; however there is still a chance of confrontation that could end in a fatal fight. A sandy substrate is ideal to allow for easy foraging and to facilitate burrowing habits. Several hiding places should be provided; the use of driftwood, aquarium décor, and aquatic plants (real or plastic/silk) are ideal. Despite what many hobbyists may say, Red Claw Crabs are not fully aquatic and must have access to land. This can be done by having a half-land-half-water style aquarium set-up, or by having aquarium decorations that are taller than the water line. 
These crabs are excellent climbers and great escape artists. Therefore, the water line should be at least a few inches below the rim of the tank, and a tightly fitting, fully sealed lid should always be in place. 
The water should be cycled and properly filtered. A weekly 10% water change can further improve water quality.

Tank compatibility 
Best kept in a single-species tank.  It is not recommended to house multiple males together, as they can be territorial and may fight.  However, multiple hiding places and a large aquarium providing plenty of space to set up territories can reduce this risk. 

Non-aggressive, mid- to top-dwelling and fast-swimming fish, such as most tetras, guppies, and mollies can make suitable tank-mates.  Due to their opportunistic behavior, red claw crabs tend to try to attack and eat slow moving, sick, or bottom-dwelling fish.  It is vital to ensure tank-mates can tolerate similar environmental conditions.

Feeding 
Red Claw Crabs are omnivores that readily accept a variety of foods, including shrimp pellets, fish flakes, brine shrimp, bloodworms, blanched vegetables, and nearly anything else they can get their claws on due to their opportunistic behavior.

Sexing 
Male Red Claw Crabs tend to have larger, redder claws and are more brightly colored, whereas the females have smaller, darker claws.  Males have a narrower flap on the underside, females have a wider flap.

References

Other works cited
 Red claw crab. (n.d.). Retrieved from https://web.archive.org/web/20171030163529/http://www.eliteinverts.com/red-claw-crab/
 Red clawed crab care sheet. (2012, January 3). Retrieved from 	http://www.critterhub.com/freshwater/red-clawed-crab-care-sheet/
 Red claw crab (Perisesarma bidens). (2011, August 8). Retrieved from 	http://www.theaquariumwiki.com/Perisesarma_bidens
 Tweddle, K. (n.d.). Red claw crab. Retrieved from 	http://www.badmanstropicalfish.com/profiles/profile101.html

Grapsoidea
Crustaceans described in 1835
Taxa named by Wilhem de Haan